Exchange is an unincorporated community in Green Township, Morgan County, in the U.S. state of Indiana.

History
A post office was established at Exchange in 1880, and remained in operation until it was discontinued in 1904.

Geography

References

Unincorporated communities in Morgan County, Indiana
Unincorporated communities in Indiana
Indianapolis metropolitan area